Dušan Simić (May 9, 1938 – January 9, 2023), known as Charles Simic, was a Serbian-American poet and co-poetry editor of the Paris Review. He received the Pulitzer Prize for Poetry in 1990 for The World Doesn't End, and was a finalist of the Pulitzer Prize in 1986 for Selected Poems, 1963–1983 and in 1987 for Unending Blues. He was appointed the fifteenth Poet Laureate Consultant in Poetry to the Library of Congress in 2007.

Biography

Early years
Dušan Simić was born in Belgrade. In his early childhood, during World War II, he and his family were forced to evacuate their home several times to escape indiscriminate bombing of Belgrade. Growing up as a child in war-torn Europe shaped much of his world-view, Simic stated. In an interview from the Cortland Review he said, "Being one of the millions of displaced persons made an impression on me. In addition to my own little story of bad luck, I heard plenty of others. I'm still amazed by all the vileness and stupidity I witnessed in my life."

Simic immigrated to the United States with his brother and mother to join his father in 1954, when he was sixteen. After spending a year in New York, he moved with his family to Oak Park, Illinois, where he graduated from high school. In 1961, he was drafted into the U.S. Army, and in 1966, he earned his B.A. from New York University while working at night to cover the costs of tuition.

Career
Simic began to make a name for himself in the early to mid-1970s as a literary minimalist, writing terse, imagistic poems. Critics have referred to Simic's poems as "tightly constructed Chinese puzzle boxes". He himself stated: "Words make love on the page like flies in the summer heat and the poet is merely the bemused spectator."

He was a professor of American literature and creative writing at University of New Hampshire beginning in 1973 and lived in Strafford, New Hampshire. Simic wrote on such diverse topics as jazz, art, and philosophy. He was influenced by Emily Dickinson, Pablo Neruda, and Fats Waller. He was a translator, essayist, and philosopher, opining on the current state of contemporary American poetry. He held the position of poetry editor of The Paris Review and was later replaced by Dan Chiasson. He was elected to the American Academy of Arts and Letters in 1995, received the Academy Fellowship in 1998, and was elected a chancellor of the Academy of American Poets in 2000.

Simic was one of the judges for the 2007 Griffin Poetry Prize and continued to contribute poetry and prose to The New York Review of Books. He received the US$100,000 Wallace Stevens Award in 2007 from the Academy of American Poets.

Simic was selected by James Billington, Librarian of Congress, to be the fifteenth Poet Laureate Consultant in Poetry to the Library of Congress, succeeding Donald Hall. In choosing Simic as the poet laureate, Billington cited "the rather stunning and original quality of his poetry".

In 2011, Simic was the recipient of the Frost Medal, presented annually for "lifetime achievement in poetry".

Simic's extensive papers as well as other material about his work are held at the University of New Hampshire Library Milne Special Collections and Archives.

Personal life and death
Simic married fashion designer Helene Dubin in 1964, and their union produced two children. In 1971, he became an American citizen. Simic died of complications of dementia on January 9, 2023, at age 84.

Awards
 PEN Translation Prize (1980)
 Ingram Merrill Foundation Fellowship (1983)
 MacArthur Fellowship (1984–1989)
 Pulitzer Prize finalist (1986)
 Pulitzer Prize finalist (1987)
 Pulitzer Prize for Poetry (1990)
 Wallace Stevens Award (2007)
 Frost Medal (2011)
 Vilcek Prize in Literature (2011)
 Zbigniew Herbert International Literary Award (2014)
 Golden Wreath of the Struga Poetry Evenings (2017)

Bibliography

Poetry 
Collections

 1967: 
 1969: 
 1971: Dismantling the Silence
 1972: White
 1974: Return to a Place Lit by a Glass of Milk
 1976: Biography and a Lament
 1977: Charon's Cosmology
 1978: Brooms: Selected Poems
 1978: School for Dark Thoughts
 1980: They Forage at Night
 1980: Classic Ballroom Dances
 1982: Austerities
 1983: Weather Forecast for Utopia & Vicinity: Poems, 1967–1982
 1985: Selected Poems, 1963–1983 (1986 Pulitzer Prize finalist)
 1986: Unending Blues (1987 Pulitzer Prize finalist)
 1989: Pyramids and Sphinxes
 1989: Nine Poems
 1989: The World Doesn't End: Prose Poems (1990 Pulitzer Prize for Poetry)
 1990: The Book of Gods and Devils
 1992: Hotel Insomnia
 1994: A Wedding in Hell: Poems
 1995: Frightening Toys
 1996: Walking the Black Cat: Poems, (National Book Award in Poetry finalist)
 1997: 
 1999: Jackstraws: Poems (The New York Times Notable Book of the Year) 
 1999: 
 2001: Night Picnic, 
 2003: The Voice at 3:00 am: Selected Late and New Poems 
 2004: Selected Poems: 1963–2003, 2004 (winner of the 2005 International Griffin Poetry Prize)
 2005: Aunt Lettuce, I Want to Peek under Your Skirt (illustrated by Howie Michels)
 2005: My Noiseless Entourage: Poems, 
 2008: 60 Poems, 
 2008: That Little Something: Poems, 
 2008: The Monster Loves His Labyrinth: Notebooks, 
 2010: 
 2013: 
 2013: 
 2015: 
 2017: 
 2019: 
 2022: 

Translations

 1970: Ivan V. Lalić, Fire Gardens
 1970: Vasko Popa, The Little Box: Poems
 1970: Four Modern Yugoslav Poets: Ivan V. Lalić, Branko Miljkovic, Milorad Pavić, Ljubomir Simović
 1979: Vasko Popa, Homage to the Lame Wolf: Selected Poems
 1983: Co-translator, Slavko Mihalić, Atlantis
 1987: Tomaž Šalamun, Selected Poems
 1987: Ivan V. Lalić, Roll Call of Mirrors
 1989: Aleksandar Ristović, Some Other Wine or Light
 1991: Slavko Janevski, Bandit Wind
 1992: Novica Tadić, Night Mail: Selected Poems
 1992: Horse Has Six Legs: Contemporary Serbian Poetry
 1999: Aleksandar Ristović, Devil's Lunch
 2003: Radmila Lazić, A Wake for the Living
 2004: Günter Grass, The Günter Grass Reader
 2019: Vasko Popa, Selected Poems

List of poems

Non-fiction 

 1985: The Uncertain Certainty: Interviews, Essays, and Notes on Poetry
 1990: Wonderful Words, Silent Truth: Essays on Poetry and a Memoir
 1992: Dime-Store Alchemy: The Art of Joseph Cornell
 1994: The Unemployed Fortune-Teller: Essays and Memoirs
 1997: Orphan Factory: Essays and Memoirs
 2000: A Fly in the Soup: Memoirs
 2003: The Metaphysician in the Dark (University of Michigan Press, Poets on Poetry Series)
 2006: 
 2008: The Renegade: Writings on Poetry and a Few Other Things
 2015: The Life of Images: Selected Prose

See also
 Biljana D. Obradović
 Serbs in America

References

External links

Profiles
Profile and poems of Charles Simic, including audio files, at the Poetry Foundation.
Profile and poems written and audio at Poetry Archive
poets.org biography, poems written and audio
Griffin Poetry Prize biography and video clip
Hossack, Irene. "Charles Simic". The Literary Encyclopedia; first published May 4, 2006.

Work
Charles Simic Poetry, published in Issue Three and Issue Four of The Coffin Factory
Charles Simic Online Resources, Library of Congress
Audio recording (.mp3) of Charles Simic reading at the Key West Literary Seminar, 2003
"Seven Prose Poems" by Charles Simic in The Cafe Irreal Issue 13, February 1, 2005
Simic reading from a collection of his own works (Audio, 14 mins)
Video of Charles Simic reading at Boston University's Robert Lowell Memorial Lecture, 2009 (60 mins)
php? collection/Audio recording 40 Charles Simic Poems read by Thomas Boeck at Voetica.com
Simic author page and article archive from The New York Review of Books

Interviews and review

Poetry featured in The Coffin Factory issues 3 and 4
The Cortland Review interview  (August 1998) 
 "Charles Simic: The Orphan Of Silence"; Doctoral thesis by Goran Mijuk, February 1, 2002
An Interview with Charles Simic by Dejan Stojanović Serbian Magazine, August 9–23, 1991 (No. 89)
SESSIONS: Confessions of a Poet Laureate, shorts.nthword.com, April 18, 2011
 2008 Bomb Magazine discussion between Charles Simic & Tomaž Šalamun

1938 births
2023 deaths
American male poets
American Poets Laureate
MacArthur Fellows
Members of the American Academy of Arts and Letters
Fellows of the American Academy of Arts and Sciences
Naturalized citizens of the United States
Poets from New Hampshire
Writers from Oak Park, Illinois
Pulitzer Prize for Poetry winners
Serbian emigrants to the United States
Serbian male poets
American people of Serbian descent
The New Yorker people
Translators to English
People from Strafford, New Hampshire
Poets from Illinois
Military personnel from Illinois
Military personnel from New Hampshire
United States Army soldiers
Writers from Belgrade
Struga Poetry Evenings Golden Wreath laureates
University of New Hampshire faculty
Deaths from dementia in New Hampshire